Auto Esporte Clube do Piauí, commonly known as Auto Esporte, are a Brazilian football team from Teresina. They  won the Campeonato Piauiense once and competed in the Série A once.

History
They were founded on May 1, 1951, by self-employed car drivers. The club won the Campeonato Piauiense in 1983. Auto Esporte competed in the Série A in 1984, when they were eliminated in the Repescagem stage by Joinville, of Santa Catarina.

Stadium
They play their home games at the Lindolfinho stadium. The stadium has a maximum capacity of 8,000 people.

Anthem

Auto Esporte, Auto Esporte

Luta com muito amor

Eu vou com o alviverde

Para onde ele for 

É com amor e alegria

Que a gente vai torcer 

Eu levo minha bandeira verde e branco

Para todo mundo ver

Eu sou alviverde 

E alviverde hei de ser

Eu sou Auto Esporte

Auto Esporte até morrer

A cidade toda vibra

Gritando “campeão, campeão”

Viva o calhambeque

Que explode o nosso coração

Nós vamos dizer todos irão

Do Piauí o Auto Esporte é campeão

Achievements

 Campeonato Piauiense:
 Winners (1): 1983

Runner-up: Tiradentes

References

Association football clubs established in 1951
Football clubs in Piauí
1951 establishments in Brazil